Merrifield is an unincorporated community and census-designated place (CDP) in Lake Edward Township, Crow Wing County, Minnesota, United States, near Brainerd. It is along Crow Wing County Road 3 near County Road 127. Its population was 140 as of the 2010 census.

Demographics

History
A post office called Merrifield has been in operation since 1899. The community was named for the original owner of the town site.

Education
It is in Brainerd Public Schools. The zoned high school is Brainerd High School.

References

Census-designated places in Crow Wing County, Minnesota
Census-designated places in Minnesota